William Dodd may refer to:

William Dodd (ambassador) (1869–1940), U.S. ambassador to Nazi Germany from 1933 to 1937
William E. Dodd Jr. (1905–1952), U.S. leftist politician, New Dealer, and possible Soviet sympathizer
William Dodd (priest) (1729–1777), English clergyman who was hanged for fraud in 1777
William J. Dodd (1862–1930), American architect
Bill Dodd (1909–1991), Louisiana politician and writer
William Huston Dodd (1844–1930), Member of Parliament for North Tyrone
William Dodd (cricketer) (1908–1993), English cricketer
William Dodd (writer) (1804–?), working class writer in Britain and the USA
William Dodd (fiction), fictional character in the Richard Sharpe series of novels

See also
Billy Dodds (born 1969), Scottish footballer